The NYC Condom is a male condom offered by the New York City Department of Health and Mental Hygiene's NYC Condom Availability Program (NYCAP). The program distributes free safer sex products (including male condoms, internal condoms (FC2) and lubricant).

The NYC Condom is the first municipally branded condom in the United States.

Launch

The NYC Condom was launched on Valentine's Day, 2007 with a highly successful citywide media campaign including bilingual subway ads, radio spots, club launch parties, and street teams distributing the NYC Condom at high pedestrian traffic spots throughout the city.

Find or Order Free Safer Sex Products 
The NYC Condom Availability Program distributes free safer sex products to both individuals and organizations across the five boroughs of New York City.

 Individuals in New York City can use the NYC Health Map to find where to obtain free safer sex products in a neighborhood near you.
 Businesses or organizations operating inside the five boroughs of New York City may order free safer sex products from the NYC Condom Availability Program by visiting their website and looking for the NYC Safer Sex Portal.

Distribution

The NYC Condom Availability Program welcomes businesses or organizations operating within New York City to order free safer sex products, in bulk, through the NYC Safer Sex Portal.  Individuals can find and obtain free safer sex products by searching the NYC Health Map. Distribution sites listed on the NYC Health Map have opted-in as locations where any person can visit to obtain free safer sex products, no questions asked. These sites are maintained through a variety of contracts overseen by the NYC Health Department.

NYC OpenData is a data set showcasing the current listing of locations where individuals may find and obtain free safer sex products distributed by the City. This resource is updated daily. This resource can be used to populate other condom finder smartphone apps or websites. NYC OpenData is a project of the New York City Department of Information Technology and Telecommunications (DoITT))

Additional Services 
The NYC Condom Availability Program provides free customized presentations aimed at educating New Yorkers about the correct use of free safer sex products, condom negotiation skills, condom distribution and/or storage, etc. The program reviews and responses to concerns regarding NYC condoms and other free safer sex products distributed by the program.

Design

In 2008, industrial designer Yves Behar redesigned the NYC Condom logo and packaging, as well as NYC Condom vending machines to be placed around the city.

In 2010, the New York City Department of Health and Mental Hygiene ran a contest to design a limited edition condom wrapper.  The winning entry, by designer Luis Acosta, is based on a computer's power button and began distribution in Autumn 2010.

In 2014, the NYC Condom Availability Program re-launched the NYC Condom (using a blue wrapper) and introduced an NYC LifeStyle branded Large Condom called the NYC KYNG Condom.

In 2016, the NYC Condom is re-launched using the ONE Condom.

Products Offered

All male condoms and lubricants provided by the NYC Condom Availability Program are rebranded ONE Condom products.  Previous versions of the NYC Condom were rebranded LifeStyles Condoms.

Internal Condoms (FC2) [formerly known as the female condom] products are supplied by Veru Inc.

History 
Six months after the unveiling of the NYC Condom, the city's average monthly condom distribution increased from 1.5 million to more than 3 million condoms per month.

On Valentine's Day 2011, the New York City Department of Health unveiled a smartphone application which directs the user to the nearest source of free NYC Condoms.

A 2012 report found NYC Condoms being smuggled out of the city and illicitly sold for profit in places such as the Dominican Republic.

See also
Life Guard DC

References

Condom brands
Culture of New York City
Healthcare in New York City
American brands
New York City Department of Health and Mental Hygiene